The 12449 / 12450 Goa Sampark Kranti Express is one of the most important trains among the Sampark Kranti Express trains series operated on Indian Railways by the Northern Railway Delhi Division between  and , a town in the Indian state of Goa The train is extended to Chandigarh similar to Kerala Sampark Kranti recently.

As of 2015, this train is running on a bi-weekly basis and holds Superfast status.

Train details

 12449DN Madgaon–Chandigarh via New Delhi and Hazrat Nizamuddin Goa Sampark Kranti Express
 12450UP Chandigarh–Madgaon Goa Sampark Kranti Express

In 2008 Indian Railway Budget, the train announced to run bi-weekly as the frequency increased from weekly to bi-weekly.

Alternative trains for Madgaon or Goa from national capital 

 12779/12780 Vasco-Da-Gama  H.Nizamuddin Goa Express – daily via, Madgaon, Belgaum, Miraj, Bhusawal, Bhopal
 12617/12618 Mangala Lakshadweep Express – via Konkan Railways, Panvel, Bhusawal, Bhopal
 12431/12432 Trivandrum–H.Nizamuddin Thiruvananthapuram Rajdhani Express via, Vadodara, Konkan Railway
 22413/22414 Madgaon–H.Nizamuddin Madgaon Rajdhani Express via Vadodara, Konkan Railway
 12217/12218 Kochuveli–Chandigarh Kerala Sampark Kranti Express via Vadodara, Konkan Railway
 12483/12484 Kochuveli–Amritsar Weekly Express via Vadodara, Konkan Railway
 22659/22660 Kochuveli–Dehradun Superfast Express via Vadodara, Konkan Railway
 22633/22634 Thiruvananthapuram–Hazrat Nizamuddin Express via Vadodara, Konkan Railway
 12283/12284 Ernakulam–H.Nizamuddin Duronto Express via Vadodara, Konkan Railway
 22653/22654 Thiruvananthapuram–Hazrat Nizamuddin Express (via Kottayam), Vadodara, Konkan Railway
 22655/22656 Thiruvananthapuram–Hazrat Nizamuddin Express (via Alappuzha), Vadodara, Konkan Railway

Traction

Now that the electrification of Konkan Railways has been completed, since 17/10/2022 a Ludhiana based WAP-7 loco hauls this train for the entire journey.

Route & Halts
This train halts at the following stations
 
 
 
 
  
 
 
 
 
 
 
 Pernem
 Thivim
 Karmali

See also 
 Goa Express
 Trains of SWR
 Konkan Railways
 Andhra Pradesh Sampark Kranti Express
 Madhya Pradesh Sampark Kranti

References 

 Indian Railways

Transport in Margao
Sampark Kranti Express trains
Rail transport in Goa
Rail transport in Maharashtra
Rail transport in Gujarat
Rail transport in Rajasthan
Rail transport in Delhi
Rail transport in Haryana
Rail transport in Chandigarh
Railway services introduced in 2004